Revista Chilena de Entomología is a peer-reviewed scientific journal covering all aspects of entomology. It is published by the Sociedad Chilena de Entomología and the editor-in-chief is José Mondaca E.. The journal was established in 1951.

Abstracting and indexing
The journal is abstracted and indexed in Biological Abstracts, BIOSIS Previews, CAB Abstracts, and The Zoological Record.

References

External links 
 

Entomology journals and magazines
Publications established in 1951
Academic journals published by non-profit organizations of Chile
Multilingual journals